Connemara Hill Lamb is a variety of lamb which  was granted  Protected Geographical Indication status under European Union law in 1999. Connemara is a region of County Galway in Ireland.

See also
 Irish cuisine
 List of Republic of Ireland food and drink products with protected status

References

Irish cuisine
Irish products with protected designation of origin
Irish meat dishes